The women's cross country mountain biking competition at the 2014 Commonwealth Games in Glasgow, Scotland was held on 29 July at the Cathkin Braes Mountain Bike Trails. Mountain biking returned to the program, after last being competed back in 2006.

Schedule 
All times are British Summer Time

Result
Final results:

References

Cycling at the 2014 Commonwealth Games
Mountain biking at the Commonwealth Games
Comm